A Radical Recital is a live recording of a Rasputina recital held in Pittsburgh, Pennsylvania, at  Mr. Smalls Funhouse on Halloween, 2004 (although the album cover claims it to have been 1804). It contains songs from the previous Rasputina albums, and lead singer Melora Creager's spoken introductions. It also has their first recorded release of their cover of "Barracuda", a staple of their live shows.

Critical reception
A review from PopMatters praised Creager's songwriting, as well as the variation in style and arrangement, stating, "The best thing about A Radical Recital is that Rasputina really does have a unique sound, something that is needed more than ever in alternative/pop/rock music."

Track listing

Bonus tracks
 "New Zero" – 4:01 (iTunes bonus track)

Personnel
Melora Creager – cello, vocals
Zoë Keating – cello
Jonathon TeBeest – drums

References

Rasputina (band) albums
2005 live albums